Cyprus participated in the Junior Eurovision Song Contest 2004 which took place in Lillehammer, Norway. Marios Tofi represented the country with the song "Oneira".

Before Junior Eurovision

National final
The final was held on 7 September 2004, hosted by Nikos Mpogiatzis. The winner was chosen by a 50/50 combination of votes from a professional jury and public televoting. Only the televoting results were revealed which Marios Tofi won, with Louis Panagiotis placing second and Rafail Georgiou & Anna Loizou placing in third.

At Junior Eurovision

Voting

References 

Cyprus
2004
Junior Eurovision Song Contest